I'm Good is the debut extended play by South Korean singer, Elsie (also known as Eunjung), a member of T-ara. The EP was released on May 7, 2015 by MBK Entertainment with the title track I'm Good, featuring popular singer K.Will.

On October 30, 2015, the EP was re-released under the title Goodbye with the title track as the same name.

Release
On May 7, 2015, Elsie released her debut extended play "I'm Good", featuring popular singer K.Will. Elsie also released the Korean and Chinese version of the title track "I'm Good" on May 26, 2015. The music video was starred by her labelmate KI-O (former SPEED's member). He also featured in her live performances.

On October 13, 2015, Elsie released the soundtrack for T-ara web drama Sweet Temptation titled "Goodbye", along with two music videos for the Korean and Chinese versions. Elsie later re-released the EP as a limited edition album, with the title track "Goodbye" on October 30.

Commercial performance 
The Korean music video for "Goodbye" reached at #1 for weekly chart and #3 for monthly chart on China's YinYueTai V Chart. It was also included in the list of "Best songs to listen to in October 2015" by TV Report.

Track listing

Chart performance

Release history

References

T-ara albums
2015 debut EPs
Korean-language EPs
Dance-pop EPs
Kakao M EPs